The 2016 Men's Junior Pan-Am Championship was the 11th edition of the Men's Pan American Junior Championship. It was held from 20 to 28 May 2016 in Toronto, Canada.

The tournament served as a qualifier for the 2016 Men's Hockey Junior World Cup, held in Lucknow, India in December 2016.

Argentina won the tournament for the 11th time, defeating Canada 5–0 in the final. Chile won the bronze medal by defeating United States 4–1 in the third and fourth place playoff.

Participating nations
Alongside the host nation, 7 teams competed in the tournament.

Results

Preliminary round

Pool A

Pool B

Classification round

Bracket

Quarter-finals

Fifth to eighth place classification

Cross-overs

Seventh and eighth place

Fifth and sixth place

Semi-finals

Third and fourth place

Final

Statistics

Final standings

See also
2016 Women's Pan-Am Junior Championship

References

Pan American Junior Championship
Pan American Junior Championship
International field hockey competitions hosted by Canada
International sports competitions in Toronto
2016 in Toronto
Pan American Junior Championship
Pan American Junior Championship
Pan American Championship